Olga Fyodorovna Kovitidi (Ukrainian: Ольга Федорівна Ковітіді; Russian: Ольга Фёдоровна Ковитиди; born on 7 May 1962), is a Russian and former Ukrainian politician who is currently a member of the Federation Council with the executive branch of the Republic of Crimea.

She was a former member of the Supreme Council of the Autonomous Republic of Crimea in Ukraine from 26 March 2006 to 17 March 2014. She was the deputy chairman of the Council of Ministers of the Republic of Crimea from 18 March to 26 March 2014. Koviditi was also the Assistant Minister of Justice of Ukraine from 2013 to 2014.

She is a Candidate of Law, Associate Professor. She was the Chairman of the Union of Lawyers of the Autonomous Republic of Crimea. She is also the Deputy Chairman of the Union of Lawyers of Ukraine. She was a member of the World Association of Lawyers, World Congress of Lawyers of Ukrainian origin, and a member of the Council of the World Greek Interparliamentary Union.

Kovitidi is known on Russian television for her Ukrainophobic statements.

Biography
In 2010, she joined the Party of Regions.

On 26 March 2014, the State Council of the Republic of Crimea appointed Kovitidi a member of the Federation Council from the executive power of the republic - the Council of Ministers of the Republic of Crimea. She was confirmed on 15 April 2014. She is also a member of the Federation Council Committee on Defense and Security.

In February 2015, at the winter session held on February 18–20 in Vienna, the OSCE Parliamentary Assembly refused to recognize the credentials of Kovitidi, a member of the Russian delegation, who was included in its composition as “the first member of the Federation Council of the Federal Assembly of the Russian Federation from the executive power of the Republic of Crimea”. The decision was made on 18 February at a meeting of the Credentials Committee, because "a parliamentarian nominated to work in the PA must represent the country that makes the presentation - and not the authority that was established on foreign soil by methods that most OSCE countries recognize as illegal."

Kovitidi is on the sanctions list adopted by the European Union in the conflict with the civil conflict in Ukraine. The Prosecutor's Office of the ARC is suspected of high treason, in connection with which it is put on the wanted list.

Controversies

Ukrainian phobia

On the air of the Russian program "Time will tell" on Channel One, Kovitida, referring to the words of the leader of the DNR Alexander Zakharchenko, voiced a fake that Ukrainian security forces in Donbas "rape children by pouring foam concrete into their vaginas."

References

External links

1962 births
Living people
Party of Regions politicians
United Russia politicians
Members of the Federation Council of Russia (after 2000)
Russian individuals subject to European Union sanctions